Lou Gish (27 May 1967 – 20 February 2006) was an English stage, film and television actress.

Biography

She was born Louise Mikel Henrietta Marie Curram in 1967, the elder daughter of actors Sheila Gish and Roland Curram. She was raised in London and originally wanted to be an artist rather than an actor. She trained in Camberwell and earned a bachelor's degree at the Camberwell College of Arts.

A role in a play in Paddington brought her to the attention of an agent, and this convinced her to follow her family into a career in the theatre, taking roles on stage, in television series, and in film. She appeared with her sister, Kay Curram, in King Lear at the Chichester Festival Theatre in 2005.

Gish was in a relationship with actor Nicholas Rowe from 2000 until her death from cancer at the age of 38 in February 2006. Her death came less than a year after that of her mother, who also died of cancer.

Both she and her mother are buried on the eastern side of Highgate Cemetery.

Film and television career

 Amazed - "Kara Smith" (1983)
 Game On - "Bruce Willis & Robert De Niro Holding a Fish" (1996)
 Holding the Baby (1997)
 Bent (1997)
 Microsoap (1998)
 Hope and Glory (1999)
 Casualty - "Blood Brothers" (2000)
 Without Motive (2000)
 Where the Heart Is - "Runaways" (2001)
 Coupling (2001–2002)
 The Vice - "One More Time" (2002)
 Wire in the Blood - "Shadows Rising" (2002)
 Doctors - "High Anxiety" (2004)
 Casualty - "Love's Labours ... Lost" (2004)
 EastEnders (2004–2005)
 New Tricks (2005)

Theatrical career 
 Tejas Verdes (Gate Theatre 2005)
 King Lear (Chichester Festival Theatre 2005, as Goneril)

References

External links 

1967 births
2006 deaths
Burials at Highgate Cemetery
English stage actresses
Deaths from cancer in England
English television actresses
English film actresses